Late Lunch Live was an Irish afternoon television show on TV3. It premiered live on 30 September 2013 airing every Monday to Friday from 14:00. By 2014 the show was moved to a new timeslot of 15:30 to 16:30.

The program features news and weather updates, showbiz, fashion, beauty, food, health and lifestyle. Its in-studio presenters are Lucy Kennedy, Martin King and previously reporter Claire Solan took part in the show.

As part of the revamp of TV3's Daytime schedule due to falling audience figures an extended version of Ireland AM and Late Lunch Live replace The Morning Show.

On 30 January 2015 TV3 Group confirmed the show's cancellation to make way for a new show called The 7 O'Clock show, which premiered on 16 February 2015. Both presenters of The Late Lunch Live moved to the new show.

References

External links
 Late Lunch Live

1999 Irish television series debuts
2000s Irish television series
2010s Irish television series
Irish television talk shows
Virgin Media Television (Ireland) original programming